Camino (styled as camino) is a Japanese rock band which has released multiple singles and albums, as well as performed songs for the soundtracks of anime, dramas, and other Japanese programming. Their single "Story" has been used as the first opening theme for Tomica Hero: Rescue Force. Their next single, "The Life", is used as the second opening theme for Rescue Force.

Members
 Hayato - Vocals (2003–present)
 Kiku - Guitar (2003–present)
 Taka - Bass guitar (2003–present)
 Ryosuke - Keyboards (2003–present)
 Rehit - Drums (2003–present)

Discography

Albums
Arise - April 22, 2003
IC Brain - June 24, 2004
L+ - November 11, 2007
New Life - April 8, 2009

Singles
"Lovin' moon" - June 9, 2005
c/w "Wings" & "Just!!"
"Lovin' moon 2006" - October 2, 2006
c/w "Myself (H track)" & "Silver Phantom"
"Nostalgia" - June 23, 2007
c/w "Drive"
Used as the opening theme for Koutetsu Sangokushi
"Story" - June 25, 2008
c/w "So sweet Lo..."
Used as the first opening theme for Tomica Hero: Rescue Force
"The Life" - December 17, 2008
c/w "Everything" and "One Way To Rock!!"
Used as the second opening theme for Tomica Hero: Rescue Force

References

External links
Official website 
Official blog 
J!-ENT's Michelle Tymon interviews Camino (November 2008)

Avex Group artists
Japanese rock music groups